Marvin Antonio Loría Leitón (born 24 April 1997) is a Costa Rican professional footballer who plays as a winger for Major League Soccer club Portland Timbers and the Costa Rica national team.

Club career
Loría came through the academy at Deportivo Saprissa, making his professional debut for the club on 24 November 2013 in a 1–1 draw with Cartaginés. He spent time on loan with Benfica B, before moving abroad again on 9 March 2018 to the United States with USL side Portland Timbers 2.

Loría signed a first-team contract with Portland Timbers of Major League Soccer in December 2018. In his debut match, Loria scored his first MLS goal with his very first shot on 22 June 2019.

International
On 2 February 2019, he made his debut for the Costa Rica national team as a starter in a friendly against the United States.

Honours
Saprissa
Liga FPD: Apertura 2016, Clausura 2018

Portland Timbers
MLS is Back Tournament: 2020

References

External links

1997 births
Living people
Costa Rican footballers
Costa Rican people of Italian descent
Association football forwards
Deportivo Saprissa players
S.L. Benfica B players
Portland Timbers 2 players
Portland Timbers players
Costa Rica under-20 international footballers
Costa Rican expatriate footballers
USL Championship players
Costa Rica international footballers
Major League Soccer players
MLS Next Pro players